The 1982–83 Yugoslav First Basketball League season was the 39th season of the Yugoslav First Basketball League, the highest professional basketball league in SFR Yugoslavia.

Regular season

Classification

Play-off

Play-In Qualifying Round 

Jugoplastika-IMT  98-97

Olimpija-Rabotnički  93-82

Quarter-finals 

Šibenka-Jugoplastika  104-102, 85-98, 91-75

Crvena Zvezda-Cibona  103-73, 92-84  

Partizan-Olimpija  94-81, 76-77, 111-108

Bosna-Zadar  98-103, 89-87, 121-109

Semi-finals 

Šibenka-Crvena Zvezda 	91-88, 89-105, 98-89

Partizan-Bosna 	85-95, 81-87

Finals 

Šibenka-Bosna 	103-98, 84-96, 83-82 

On 9 April 1983, Šibenka and Bosna played the deciding Game 3 of their playoff final series that was decided in the last second. With Bosna up by a point and the clock winding down Šibenka had the last possession, Bosna's Sabit Hadžić was controversially adjudged by the referee Ilija Matijević to have fouled Šibenka's Dražen Petrović as he went up for a shot at the buzzer. Since being in the act of shooting, Petrović got two free throws and proceeded to score both, winning the game and championship for his team. Next morning, the Basketball Federation of Yugoslavia (KSJ) presidency reviewed the game on account the time expired prior to the foul being called and on account of refereeing irregularities. They decided to void the result, ordering a single-game title playoff at a neutral venue in Novi Sad. Šibenka decided to boycott the decision. Since Šibenka refused to show up for the Novi Sad game, the title was awarded to Bosna.

Winning team

Roster 
The winning roster of Bosna:
  Borislav Vučević
  Bogoljub Đurić
  Predrag Benaček
  Spomenko Pajević
  Mario Primorac
  Ratko Radovanović
  Dragan Zrno
  Žarko Varajić
  Emir Mutapčić
  Sabit Hadžić
  Miroljub Mitrović

Coaching staff 
The coaching staff:
 Svetislav Pešić, Head coach

Scoring leaders
Scoring leaders:
Duško Ivanović (Budućnost) - 603 points (27.4 ppg)
Dražen Petrović (Šibenka) - 561 points (25.5 ppg)
Peter Vilfan (Olimpija) - 535 points (25.4 ppg)

Qualification in 1983-84 season European competitions

FIBA European Champions Cup
  Bosna (champions)
FIBA Cup Winner's Cup
  Cibona (Cup winners)
FIBA Korać Cup
  Šibenka (1st)
  Partizan (2nd)
  Crvena Zvezda (4th)
  Zadar (6th)

References

Yugoslav First Basketball League seasons
Yugo
Yugo
Basketball